, sometimes rendered Saruga, is a Shinto shrine in Hirakawa, Aomori Prefecture, Japan. The shrine is said to have been founded in 807, when Sakanoue no Tamuramaro came north during the campaigns against the Ezo. The Honden, dating to 1826, is a Prefecturally-designated Important Cultural Property. Preserved  are a City-designated Important Cultural Property (Historic Materials). There is an annual rice-planting festival and a pond of pink lotus. The main kami enshrined here is Kamitsukenokimitaji no mikoto (上毛野君田道命).

See also

 Seito shoin teien
 Seibi-en

References

Shinto shrines in Aomori Prefecture
Hirakawa, Aomori
9th-century establishments in Japan
Shugendō
Shinbutsu bunri
Religious buildings and structures completed in 807

Beppyo shrines